Together! is a jazz album by drummers ”Philly” Joe Jones and Elvin Jones recorded in 1961 and released on the Atlantic label. It features trumpeter Blue Mitchell, trombonist Curtis Fuller, tenor saxophonist Hank Mobley, pianist Wynton Kelly and bassist Paul Chambers.

Track listing
 "Le Roi" (Dave Baker) - 6:00 
 "Beau-ty" (Philly Joe Jones) - 12:53 
 "Brown Sugar" (Walter Davis, Jr.) - 14:58

Personnel
Blue Mitchell - trumpet
Curtis Fuller - trombone
Hank Mobley - tenor saxophone
Wynton Kelly - piano 
Paul Chambers - bass
Philly Joe Jones & Elvin Jones - drums

References 

Philly Joe Jones albums
Elvin Jones albums
1961 albums
Atlantic Records albums
Albums produced by Nesuhi Ertegun